Prim is a surname. Notable people with the name include:

Gaige Prim (born 1999), American basketball player
John G. A. Prim (1821–1875), Irish journalist and archaeologist
Juan Prim (1814–1870), Spanish general and statesman
Kristin Prim (born 1993), American fashion designer and publisher
Paine Page Prim (1822–1899), American attorney and judge
Randolph Prim (1896–1986), American baseball player 
Ray Prim (1906–1995), American baseball player
Robert C. Prim (born 1921), American mathematician and computer scientist
Santiago Prim (born 1990), Argentine footballer 
Sonia Prim (born 1984), Spanish footballer
Suzy Prim (1896–1991), French actress
Tommy Prim (born 1955), Swedish cyclist
William Prim (1882–1930), American baseball player

See also
Prim  (given name)